Janine Helland  (born April 24, 1970) is a Canadian soccer player who played as a defender for the Canada women's national soccer team. She was part of the teams at the 1995 FIFA Women's World Cup and 1999 FIFA Women's World Cup.

References

External links
 / Canada Soccer Hall of Fame
 

1970 births
Living people
Canadian women's soccer players
Canada women's international soccer players
Place of birth missing (living people)
1995 FIFA Women's World Cup players
Women's association football defenders
1999 FIFA Women's World Cup players